Kościelec  is a village in the administrative district of Gmina Pakość, within Inowrocław County, Kuyavian-Pomeranian Voivodeship, in north-central Poland.

The village has a population of 680.

References

Villages in Inowrocław County